is a Japanese field hockey player for the Japanese national team.

She participated at the 2018 Women's Hockey World Cup.

References

1992 births
Living people
Japanese female field hockey players
Female field hockey goalkeepers
Field hockey players at the 2018 Asian Games
Asian Games gold medalists for Japan
Asian Games medalists in field hockey
Medalists at the 2018 Asian Games
Universiade bronze medalists for Japan
Universiade medalists in field hockey
Medalists at the 2013 Summer Universiade
21st-century Japanese women